Juneau-Douglas Yadaa.at Kalé High School (abbreviated JDHS or JDYKHS) is one of three high schools in Juneau, Alaska. It is one of two primary high schools for the Juneau School District, the other being Thunder Mountain High School. While Juneau-Douglas High School primarily serves students in Douglas and downtown Juneau, students in the district are free to attend either high school, and make their selection during their final months of eighth grade. Thunder Mountain High School is roughly the same size, but primarily serves students from the Mendenhall Valley. As of the 2021–2022 school year, Paula Casperson is the principal.

In 2019, the school was renamed Juneau-Douglas Yadaa.at Kalé High School to honor the original Tlingit heritage of Juneau. The school's name Yadaa.at Kalél, meaning “beautifully adorned face” in the Tlingit language, comes from the name of the mountain facing the school. The school's physical address is at 1639 Glacier Avenue, Juneau, AK 99801. However, its mailing address, along with the rest of Juneau School District, is 10004 Crazy Horse Dr. Juneau, AK 99801.

History and symbols 
The mascot of Juneau-Douglas High School is a fiercely roaring bear, and they compete as the Crimson Bears.

JDHS has undergone extensive renovations, most notably to its main hall.

Athletics 

The Crimson Bears have seen success and won championships across several sports, including being the state champions in baseball two years in a row in 2002 and 2003, the state champions in boys' cross-country two years in a row in 2004 and 2005, the state softball champions during the 2004–2005 and 2009–2010 seasons, the 2004–2005 boys' track and field state champions, the 2004–2005 boys' swim and diving state champions and the girls' state champions the following year, and the state football champions in the 2005–2006 and 2007–2008 seasons. The Crimson Bears finished second overall in the high school state soccer championship in the 2005–2006 season. In 2008, the Crimson Bears won state titles in baseball, softball, and boys' soccer.

In the '06 summer season, the tennis team enjoyed victory in Fairbanks in an Alaska-wide tournament. In 2008 the Bears baseball, softball, and boys' soccer programs all won state titles. In 2010 both baseball and boys' soccer won state championships, and the boys' soccer team repeated in 2011 for a second straight state championship. The women's basketball team beat Wasilla to become the state champions in 2010. JDHS women's basketball lost to Wasilla the next year, in 2011, in the state championship game. In 2016, the JDHS boys varsity beat Dimond High School for the state title. Girls Varsity Soccer won the state title for the 2017–2018 school year, and the JDHS Cross Country team won the state championship for the 2018–2019 season.

JDHS's girls' soccer team won three consecutive state championships, in 2018, 2019, and 2021, where the 2020 season was cancelled due to the COVID-19 pandemic.

Notable alumni
 Chad Bentz, Major League Baseball pitcher for the Chicago White Sox and Cincinnati Reds.
 Carlos Boozer, professional basketball player and Olympic gold medalist.
 Douglas J. Eboch, screenwriter who wrote the story for Sweet Home Alabama (2002).
 Hilary Lindh, downhill skier for the United States Ski Team and Olympic silver medalist.
Joseph Fredrick, plaintiff in the Supreme Court decision Morse v. Frederick (2007).

References

External links

 Juneau-Douglas High School official website
 Juneau-Douglas Crimson Bears official website
 Alaskan Department of Education statistics
 MSNBC article about banner case

Educational institutions established in 1927
Public high schools in Alaska
Schools in Juneau, Alaska
1927 establishments in Alaska